Dieter Paucken (born 20 September 1982) is a German footballer who plays for FC Cosmos. In September 2006 he scored the ARD's Goal of the Month.

References

External links

1982 births
Living people
German footballers
Association football goalkeepers
1. FC Köln II players
SC Fortuna Köln players
TuS Koblenz players
2. Bundesliga players
3. Liga players
Sportspeople from Koblenz
Footballers from Rhineland-Palatinate